Off Limits is an album by the Kenny Clarke/Francy Boland Big Band which was released on the Polydor label in 1971.

Track listing 
All compositions by Francy Boland, except where indicated.
 "Wintersong" (John Surman, Indian Brandee) – 6:04
 "Astrorama" (Jean-Luc Ponty) – 5:36
 "Osaka Calling" (Albert Mangelsdorff) – 4:13
 "Our Kind of Sabi" (Eddy Louiss) – 3:55
 "Sakara" – 9:33
 "Exorcisme" – 6:26
 "Endosmose" – 7:51

Personnel 
Francy Boland – piano,  arranger
Kenny Clarke – drums
Benny Bailey, Art Farmer, Duško Gojković, Rick Kiefer – trumpet, flugelhorn
Nat Peck, Åke Persson, Erik van Lier – trombone
Derek Humble – alto saxophone
Billy Mitchell, Ronnie Scott – tenor saxophone
Tony Coe – tenor saxophone, clarinet
Sahib Shihab – baritone saxophone, flute, soprano saxophone
Jimmy Woode – bass
Kenny Clare – drums

References 

1971 albums
Polydor Records albums
Kenny Clarke/Francy Boland Big Band albums